Corythangela galeata is a moth of the family Batrachedridae. It is known only from localities near Sydney in New South Wales, Australia.

The larvae feed on Casuarina species. They construct a slender, elongate case from small pieces of the branches of their host plant.

References

External links
Australian Faunal Directory

Moths of Australia
Batrachedridae
Moths described in 1897